Michail Pirgelis (born 1976) is a German sculptor.

Pirgelis was born in Essen. He studied at the Kunstakademie Düsseldorf, with Rosemarie Trockel. Pirgelis uses pieces of decommissioned commercial aircraft with minimal intervention; they are presented as ready-mades. He lives and works in Cologne.

Awards
2007: Villa Romana prize
2010: Audi Art Award for New Positions at Art Cologne

Exhibitions
2008: Artlab21
2010: Sprüth Magers, Berlin

References

External links
 

Living people
1976 births
Artists from Essen
German male sculptors
Kunstakademie Düsseldorf alumni